Qaleh Sargah (also Romanized as Qal‘eh Sargāh and Qal‘eh-ye Sargāh; also known as Qal‘eh-ye Saga, Qal eh-ye Sarkeh, and Sargāh) is a village in Dasht-e Laleh Rural District, Asir District, Mohr County, Fars Province, Iran. At the 2006 census, its population was 373, in 70 families.

References 

Populated places in Mohr County